Thaddeaus Inglehart Wilborn (born December 16, 1958) is an American former Major League Baseball outfielder. He played during two seasons at the major league level for the Toronto Blue Jays and New York Yankees. He was drafted by the Yankees in the 4th round of the  amateur draft. Wilbron was traded to the San Francisco Giants in 1982, but sent down to the minors.

References

External links

1958 births
Living people
American expatriate baseball players in Canada
Toronto Blue Jays players
New York Yankees players
Major League Baseball outfielders
Baseball players from Texas
Miami Marlins (FSL) players
Fort Lauderdale Yankees players
Phoenix Giants players
Oneonta Yankees players
Rochester Red Wings players
Denver Zephyrs players
Syracuse Chiefs players
Charlotte O's players
Hagerstown Suns players
Nashville Sounds players
African-American baseball players